Number 10 is a drama series for BBC Radio 4 about a fictional British Prime Minister and his staff. The series was created by Jonathan Myerson, and produced by Clive Brill of Pacificus Productions, with Peter Hyman as Political Advisor. It has had five series to date, in 2007, 2008, 2009, 2010, and 2012. The first three series starred Antony Sher as Adam Armstrong, the Labour Prime Minister. The fourth series replaced him with Damian Lewis as a Tory prime minister in a minority government, in response to the United Kingdom coalition government which took office in 2010.

Reception
The Independent wrote "Myerson's radio play was Shakespearean in its intrigue, its moments of tragedy and comedy and in its multi-layered action....Sixty action-packed minutes led to a gripping denouement. Number 10 possesses the fast pace that is found in the best of TV drama, which radio has been crying out for. Bring on the next four plays."

Cast

Regular

Series 1 to 3
 Adam Armstrong – Sir Antony Sher
 Monica Smith – Sasha Behar
 Polly Cairns – Haydn Gwynne
 Colin Brenner – Colin McFarlane
 Steve McKie – Stephen Mangan (Series 1 and 3)
 Steve McKie – Julian Rhind-Tutt (Series 2)

Series 4 & 5
 Simon Laity ..... Damian Lewis
 Constance "Connie" Merchant ..... Haydn Gwynne (Series 4)
 Constance "Connie" Merchant ..... Stella Gonet (Series 5)
 Nathan Toltzn ..... Mike Sengelow
 Sir Hugo Bathgate ..... Julian Glover
 Amjad Hemmati ..... Arsher Ali
 Alan ..... John Hollingworth
 Georgina "Georgie" Cullinan ..... Gina McKee

Guest cast

Series 1

Episode 1
 Frank ...... Anthony O'Donnell
 Lord Cairns ...... James Laurenson
 Nigel Ogden ...... Christopher Ettridge
 Rebecca ...... Flora Montgomery
 Conrad ...... Nick Rowe
 Ms Austen ...... Claire Perkins
 Journalist and News reader ...... Alice Arnold

Episode 2
 Kevin Munro ...... Clive Russell
 Angela Brenner ...... Emma Fielding
 Hannah Armstrong ...... Kelly Hunter
 Scottish MP ...... Nick Rowe
 Lewis Smiley MP ...... Dominic Rowan
 President Sawadogo ...... Joseph Marcell
 Ollie Armstrong ...... Joseph Kloska
 Television News Reporter ...... Alice Arnold

Episode 3
 Lord Cairns ...... James Laurenson
 Jasmine ...... Elizabeth McGovern
 Hannah ...... Kelly Hunter
 Norman Johnson ...... Shaun Prendergast
 George ...... Nicholas Grace
 Giles ...... Nicholas Woodeson
 Anita ...... Carol McReady
 Chrissie ...... Marcella Riordan

Episode 4

Episode 5
 Hannah ...... Kelly Hunter
 Major ...... Sean Baker
 General ...... Nicholas Woodeson
 Justin ...... Jamie Glover
 Billington ...... Anthony O'Donnell
 Flannery ...... Susan Brown
 Chrissie ...... Marcella Riordan
 Conrad ...... Nicholas Rowe
 Journalist ...... Alice Arnold

Episodes

Series 1
This series was first broadcast weekly at 9pm from 7 September to 5 October 2007. Episodes 1, 2 and 5 were written by Jonathan Myerson, episode 3 by Nicholas McInerny and episode 4 by Mike Harris. The series was produced and directed by Clive Brill.
Good News Day – As the Prime Minister prepares to announce an amnesty for all immigrants working illegally in the UK, a serious tube crash threatens to jeopardise his plans.
And Raise Them to Eternal Life – The party promised to eliminate Britain's carbon footprint, but poll ratings are plummeting and the unions are cutting up rough.
Who Won the Election? – As the government prepares for a major cancer screening initiative with a private American company, a leaked letter to the PM appears to advocate legalising cannabis.
Rule of Law – Launching a new organisation intended to integrate Muslims into British society and prevent radicalisation, the PM also has to decide whether to back Turkey's application for EU membership.
Home and Away – Crises loom on two fronts as the Prime Minister faces a backbench rebellion while British troops are being held hostage overseas.

References

2008 series – synopses
2009 series – synopses
2010 series – synopses

BBC Radio 4 programmes
British radio dramas